Henrik Andersen (born 23 February 1967) is a Danish weightlifter. He competed in the men's middleweight event at the 1992 Summer Olympics.

References

1967 births
Living people
Danish male weightlifters
Olympic weightlifters of Denmark
Weightlifters at the 1992 Summer Olympics
Sportspeople from Aalborg